George Manning McDade (January 7, 1893 in Saint John, New Brunswick, Canada – May 25, 1966) was a Canadian politician, lawyer, and journalist. Defeating Liberal candidate George Percival Burchill, he was elected to the House of Commons of Canada in the 1930 election as a Member of the Conservative Party to represent the riding of Northumberland.

External links
 

1893 births
1966 deaths
Conservative Party of Canada (1867–1942) MPs
Members of the House of Commons of Canada from New Brunswick
Politicians from Saint John, New Brunswick